Koninklijke Racing Club Genk is an association football club from Genk, Belgium. The team has participated in thirteen seasons of Union of European Football Associations (UEFA) club competitions, including four seasons in the Champions League, six seasons in the UEFA Cup and Europa League, two seasons in the Intertoto Cup and one season in the Cup Winners' Cup. It has played 74 UEFA games, resulting in 32 wins, 20 draws and 22 defeats. The club's first appearance was in the 1997 Intertoto Cup. Since then, Genk has been involved in a UEFA tournament every season except the 2001-02, the 2006-07 and the 2008-09 seasons. The club's best performance is reaching the group stage of the 2002-03 Champions League, the 2011-12 Champions League and the 2019-20 Champions League.

The club plays its home matches at Luminus Arena, a multi-purpose stadium in Genk. Since the building in 1999, it can host 25,000 spectators (of which 4,200 are standing places).

European record

Matches
 Q = qualification round
 PO = play-off
 R = round
 Group = group stage / Group 1 = first group stage / Group 2 = second group stage
 1/8 = eighth finals / 1/4 = quarter-finals / 1/2 = semi-finals
 F = final
 PUC = points UEFA coefficient

All-time statistics
The following is a list of the all-time statistics from Genk's games in the four UEFA tournaments it has participated in, as well as the overall total. The list contains the tournament, the number of games played (Pld), won (W), drawn (D) and lost (L). The number of goals scored (GF), goals against (GA), goal difference (GD) and the percentage of matches won (Win%). The statistics include qualification matches and is up to date as of the 2018–19 season. The statistics also include goals scored during the extra time where applicable; in these games, the result given is the result at the end of extra time.

References

Europe
Genk